Ricardo Augusto Vilela Afonso (born 18 December 1987) is a Portuguese professional racing cyclist, who last rode for UCI Continental team . He rode in the 2015 Vuelta a España, and finished in 48th place overall.

On 4 October 2022, he received a three-year ban by UCI for doping.

Major results

2008
 National Under-23 Road Championships
1st  Road race
2nd Time trial
2009
 2nd Overall Grand Prix du Portugal
2011
 4th Time trial, National Road Championships
 8th Overall Troféu Joaquim Agostinho
2012
 2nd Time trial, National Road Championships
2013
 10th Overall Tour d'Azerbaïdjan
2014
 6th Overall Volta a Portugal
2015
 5th Road race, National Road Championships
 8th Overall Route du Sud
2016
 National Road Championships
3rd Road race
5th Time trial
 6th Overall Route du Sud
 10th Overall Volta a Portugal
2017
 National Road Championships
3rd Road race
5th Time trial
 7th Overall Boucles de la Mayenne
 8th Overall Vuelta a Asturias
2018
 6th Route Adélie
 8th Overall Tour de l'Ain
 8th Overall Tour of Qinghai Lake
 9th Overall Route d'Occitanie

Grand Tour general classification results timeline

See also
 Doping in sport
 List of doping cases in cycling

References

External links
 

1987 births
Living people
Portuguese male cyclists
Place of birth missing (living people)
People from Bragança, Portugal
Sportspeople from Bragança District
Doping cases in cycling